Princella Adubea (born 27 December 1998) is a Ghanaian professional footballer who plays as a forward for Spanish club Racing de Santander and the Ghana women's national team. She represented Ghana at the U20 level at two World Cups in 2016 and 2018. She previously played for Sporting de Huelva.

Club career 
Adubea started her career with Techiman-based club Ampem Darkoa Ladies in 2014. In 2016, she led the club to their maiden Ghana Women's Premier League for the 2015–16 season after defeating the defending champions Hasaacas Ladies by a lone goal in the championship final. She scored 19 goals in 11 matches to emerge as the top goal scorer of the season. She also ended the season as the top goal scorer in the 2016 Ghana Women's FA Cup. She won the SWAG Female footballer of the year beating off competition from Elizabeth Addo and Sandra Owusu-Ansah.

She helped the club to retain their Premier League title by scoring the lone goal in the Championship final at the Baba Yara Sports Stadium against Lady Strikers. She scored 16 goals to also retain her top scorer award and win it in two consecutive seasons.

International goals

Honours 
Ampem Darkoa 

 Ghana Women's Premier League: 2015–16, 2017
Ghana Women's Super Cup: 2017, 2018
Ghana

 Turkish Women's Cup third-place: 2020

Individual

 African U-20 Women's World Cup Qualifying Tournament Top goal scorer: 2018
 Ghana Women's Premier League Top goal scorer: 2015–16, 2017
Ghana Women's Premier League Most Promising Player: 2014–15

 SWAG Female footballer of the Year: 2016, 2017
 Ghana Women's FA Cup Top goal scorer: 2016

See also
List of Ghana women's international footballers

References

External links 
 
 
 EuroSport Profile

1998 births
Living people
People from Bono East Region
Ghanaian women's footballers
Women's association football forwards
Ampem Darkoa Ladies F.C. players
Sporting de Huelva players
CDE Racing Féminas players
F.C. Kiryat Gat (women) players
Primera División (women) players
Segunda Federación (women) players
Ligat Nashim players
Ghana women's international footballers
Ghanaian expatriate women's footballers
Ghanaian expatriate sportspeople in Spain
Expatriate women's footballers in Spain
Ghanaian expatriate sportspeople in Israel
Expatriate women's footballers in Israel